The Bhekisisa Centre for Health Journalism is a nonprofit media group based in South Africa. Bhekisisa, which means “to scrutinise” in isiZulu, covers health from a social justice perspective, often using a narrative, solutions journalism approach.

It is a recognised authority on healthcare in South Africa and the African continent, and is widely referenced in local and international media, academic journals and books. Bhekisisa stories are regularly published in South Africa’s Daily Maverick, News24, the Mail & Guardian and Financial Mail.

In 2021, the nonprofit was the first media group to receive South Africa’s prestigious Reconciliation Award from the Institute for Justice and Reconciliation.

History 
Bhekisisa was launched in 2013 as a health desk based in the Mail & Guardian under the editorship of Nicholas Dawes. It was founded by senior healthcare journalist Mia Malan, with initial funding from the German government’s aid arm, the Deutsche Gesellschaft für Internationale Zusammenarbeit.

In 2015, Bhekisisa was registered as a nonprofit and received funding from the Bill & Melinda Gates Foundation, which helped the group substantially expand its reporting across the continent. In 2019, it split  from the Mail & Guardian, becoming an independent media group.

Bhekisisa is regularly cited as a successful and innovative nonprofit media organization, particularly in health reporting in Africa and the Global South.

COVID-19 
Bhekisisa was recognised as taking the lead on COVID-19 pandemic reporting in South Africa, with many relying on it over government communications for basic information about the coronavirus and COVID-19 vaccination in South Africa. Early in 2020, it partnered on a live coronavirus dashboard with the South African data journalism newsroom Media Hack Collective, collecting and interpreting unique, localized data on deaths, infections and vaccinations in Africa and South Africa.

Malan was regularly quoted by local and international media on COVID-19-related issues in South Africa and the region. She spoke globally about how journalists were reporting on the pandemic. Her op-ed article on the Omicron variant-related African travel ban was referenced by Fifa Rahman at the World Health Organization’s ACT Accelerator Council in December of 2021 to note the damaging effect the travel ban had on COVID-19 researchers discovering variants outside of the West. On 3 November 2022, the Bhekisisa team received one of the National Press Club's two annual merit awards for outstanding reporting for what the judges described as “fearlessly reporting the facts and science of COVID while being mercilessly trolled on social media”.

Notable reporting 
Since 2013, Bhekisisa’s journalists have won dozens of major journalism awards in the region.

In 2020, Joan van Dyk's article on the death of a child at the Lindela Repatriation Centre in Krugersdorp was a finalist in the 2020 Standard Bank Sikuvile Journalism Awards. The feature illustrated the impact of corruption at Bosasa, a South African prison facilities management group, on migrant healthcare. Her story resulted in the legal organisation ProBono moving forward with litigation.

In 2018, Pontsho Pilane’s #FreetoBleed series, about the disturbing knock on effects of costly menstruation products, won the Discovery Health Journalist of the Year. Pilane was invited to Parliament to present her findings about the lack of access to sanitary pads and due to Pilane's writing and other activist's work, sanitary pads were made tax-free by the South African government in 2019.

In 2016, Malan’s piece on rape in Diepsloot, a township north of Johannesburg, won both the CNN MultiChoice African Journalist Award for feature  stories and the Standard Bank Sikuvile Award for feature  stories.

In 2013, Malan’s story on ulwaluko initiation ceremonies, which left some young men in Pondoland dead or horribly disfigured from botched circumcisions, won the 2014 Standard Bank Sikuvile Award for feature stories.

References 

Non-profit organisations based in South Africa
Mass media in South Africa
Social justice organizations
African journalism